The canton of Compiègne-2 is an administrative division of the Oise department, northern France. It was created at the French canton reorganisation which came into effect in March 2015. Its seat is in Compiègne.

It consists of the following communes:
 
Armancourt
Chelles
Compiègne (partly)
Croutoy
Cuise-la-Motte
Hautefontaine
Jaux
Jonquières
Lachelle
Lacroix-Saint-Ouen
Le Meux
Pierrefonds
Saint-Étienne-Roilaye
Saint-Jean-aux-Bois
Saint-Sauveur
Venette
Vieux-Moulin

References

Cantons of Oise